William Archibald Wall (1828 – 1888) was an American painter, born in New York in 1828. Died in Paddington, London in 1888. He specialized in waterscapes, landscapes and rural and urban views. Although American by birth, Wall spent many years living and working in London.

Wall was the son of Irish-born painter William Guy Wall (1792 – 1864). Wall the elder got married in 1812, the same year he left Ireland for the United States. He and his wife had two daughters; William Archibald was their only son.

Wall contributed a landscape to the Royal Hibernian Academy in 1847 and again in 1853. He was in London in 1857 and 1858, and exhibited landscapes in those years in the Royal Academy, and in 1857 and 1859 in the British Institution. In 1861, he exhibited at the National Academy in New York. In 1865, 1870 and 1872 he again contributed to the Royal Academy, and was then living in, or near, London. His name last occurs in 1875, when he was residing at Norbiton.

In April 1871 he was living in Woking, Surrey. In April 1881 he was living on the Isle of Wight with his Sister Maria and Daughter Emily, Emily witnessed his death on 3 February 1888 at 5, Surrendale Place, Paddington.

According to Brook-Hart's book on British 19th Century Marine Painting, Wall is "a rather rare and certainly under-estimated artist".

References
Brook-Hart, Denys. British 19th Century Marine Painting. Suffolk: Antique Collectors' Club; 1974.
Marter, Joan M. The Grove Encyclopedia of American Art. Oxford: Oxford University Press; 2011, p. 142.
Wood, Christopher. Victorian Painters: Vol. 4. Suffolk: Antique Collectors' Club; 2007. p. 548

External links
Library Ireland: biography at bottom of page
Wikigallery: Artwork by William Archibald Wall
Royal Academy of Arts: 1872 summer exhibition catalogue, citing Wall's address at Norbiton

1828 births
1888 deaths
19th-century American painters
19th-century American male artists
American male painters
American watercolorists
Landscape artists